Oramiriukwa River is a stream in Imo State, Nigeria that runs a  course to drain into the Otamiri River.

Further reading 
Icthyofauna of Oramiriukwa River in Imo State, Nigeria.

References

Rivers of Nigeria
Imo State